In mathematics, a cyclotomic unit (or circular unit) is a unit of an algebraic number field which is the product of numbers of the form (ζ − 1) for ζ an nth root of unity and 0 < a < n.

Properties
The cyclotomic units form a subgroup of finite index in the group of units of a cyclotomic field.  The index of this subgroup of real cyclotomic units (those cyclotomic units in the maximal real subfield) within the full real unit group is equal to the class number of the maximal real subfield of the cyclotomic field.

 If  is a composite number having two or more distinct prime factors, then  is a unit.

The cyclotomic units satisfy distribution relations. Then for  we have 

See also
Elliptic unit
Modular unit

Notes

References
 
 
 

Algebraic number theory
Cyclotomic fields